The Graves may refer to:

 The Graves (band), a band formed by Michale Graves
 The Graves (film), a 2009 film directed by Brian Pulido
 The Graves (Massachusetts), group of rock outcroppings in Massachusetts Bay

See also
 Grave (disambiguation)
 Graves (disambiguation)
 The Grave (disambiguation)